Joe Keith (born 1 October 1978) is an English former footballer who played in the Football League for Colchester United, Bristol City, Leyton Orient, Shrewsbury Town and Brentford.

Career
Keith started his career at West Ham United as a trainee but did not make a senior appearance. He joined Colchester United in 1999 and went on to score 28 goals in 247 league and cup appearances for the club in six seasons. After a brief loan spell with Bristol City at the end of the 2004–05 season, Keith was released by Colchester and joined Leyton Orient in June 2005. He made over fifty appearances in his eighteen months at Orient. He joined Shrewsbury on loan in October 2006, returning to Orient the following month.

Keith signed for Brentford in January 2007 on a five-month contract, linking up with former Colchester teammate and then Brentford manager Scott Fitzgerald. He played 18 games for Brentford, scoring twice, before being released in May 2007. After being released by Brentford, he dropped into non-league football, joining AFC Hornchurch.

In August 2008 Keith went on to play for Tilbury of the Isthmian League First Division North where he spent a successful 2008–09, season playing 42 league games and scoring 11 goals. Keith was instrumental in helping the Dockers win their first silverware since 1975 when they won the Isthmian League Cup, beating Harrow Borough 2–0 in April 2009.

Coaching career
In the 2009–10 season Keith took a player/coach role at Tilbury where he was joined by former teammate Lee Hodges.

After a spell as a coach with East Thurrock United he joined local rivals Canvey Island as assistant manager in February 2016. He was appointed manager of Tilbury in October 2017. He left the club in November 2018. In October 2019, Keith took up a coaching role at Hashtag United.

Honours

Club
West Ham United
 FA Youth Cup Runner-up (1): 1995–96

References

External links

Living people
1978 births
Association football wingers
West Ham United F.C. players
Bristol City F.C. players
Colchester United F.C. players
Leyton Orient F.C. players
Shrewsbury Town F.C. players
Brentford F.C. players
Hornchurch F.C. players
Tilbury F.C. players
English football managers
Tilbury F.C. managers
English Football League players
Footballers from Greater London
English footballers
Association football coaches